The first government of Francisco Franco was formed on 31 January 1938 during the Spanish Civil War, shortly after having been proclaimed as Head of State of Spain.

A war cabinet, it was made up of members from various factions that would go on to form the National Movement: the FET y de las JONS party—the only legal political party in the Nationalist zone after the approval of the Unification Decree in April 1937—and the military, as well as a number of aligned-nonpartisan figures.

Council of Ministers
The Council of Ministers was structured into the office for the prime minister and 11 ministries.

Departmental structure
Francisco Franco's first government was organised into several superior and governing units, whose number, powers and hierarchical structure varied depending on the ministerial department.

Unit/body rank
() Undersecretary
() National service
() Military & intelligence agency

Notes

References

Bibliography

External links
Governments. Dictatorship of Franco (18.07.1936 / 20.11.1975). CCHS–CSIC (in Spanish).
Governments of Franco. Dictatorship Chronology (1939–1975). Fuenterrebollo Portal (in Spanish).
The governments of the Civil War and Franco's dictatorship (1936–1975). Lluís Belenes i Rodríguez History Page (in Spanish).
Biographies. Royal Academy of History (in Spanish).

1938 establishments in Spain
1939 disestablishments in Spain
Cabinets established in 1938
Cabinets disestablished in 1939
Council of Ministers (Spain)